Sir Oswald Hornby Joseph Birley  (31 March 1880 – 6 May 1952) was an English portrait painter and royal portraitist in the early part of the 20th century.

Early life and family
Birley was born in New Zealand to Hugh Francis Birley (1855–1916) while his parents were on a world tour. He was born into an old Lancashire family. Upon returning to England, he was educated at Harrow School, London and Trinity College, Cambridge.

He was the great-grandson of Hugh Hornby Birley (1778–1845), who led the troops at the Peterloo massacre.

Career

Military service
Birley served in France in World War I, first with the Royal Fusiliers, later transferring to the Intelligence Corps, obtaining the rank of captain and being awarded the Military Cross in 1919. During World War II he served with the rank of major in the Home Guard.

Painting career
A favourite of the Royal Family, Birley was well known for his portraits of King George V, Queen Mary, King George VI, Queen Elizabeth, the Queen Mother and Queen Elizabeth II.

He painted several highly regarded portraits of Sir Winston Churchill (to whom he also gave lessons), and also a life-size portrait of Mahatma Gandhi which was the first to be hung in the Lok Sabha shortly after Indian Independence on 28 August 1947.

Other subjects were many war-time leaders such as Generals Eisenhower and Montgomery, as well as Admiral Mountbatten and Air Marshal Trenchard. He also painted the wealthy American financiers Andrew Mellon and J. P. Morgan, the psychiatrist Sir James Crichton-Browne, and Welsh architect Sir Clough Williams-Ellis.
Birley painted the portrait of Leeds Lord Mayor Sir Charles Lupton (1855–1935).

Birley was knighted in 1949.

A major retrospective exhibition of Birley's work was held at the Philip Mould & Company gallery on Pall Mall  in 2007.

Personal life

In 1921, the 41-year-old Birley married the 21-year-old "Irish beauty" Rhoda Vava Mary Lecky Pike (1900–1981). They bought and refurbished Charleston Manor in East Sussex. Rhoda later founded the Charleston Manor Festival there. The couple had two children:

 Maxime Birley (1922–2009), a model and actress who married Count Alain Le Bailly de La Falaise (1905–1977) They divorced in 1950, following a series of her infidelities, including an affair with British ambassador Duff Cooper (1890–1954). She later married John McKendry, the curator of prints and photographs at the Metropolitan Museum of Art.
 Mark Birley (1930–2007), an entrepreneur and founder of Annabel's in London, who married Lady Annabel Vane-Tempest-Stewart (born 1934). They divorced in 1975 after her affair with Birley's friend Sir James Goldsmith (1933–1997).

Birley died at his home in London on 6 May 1952, a week after returning from six-week trip to the United States where he received medical assistance.

Descendants
Birley's descendants include Robin Birley (born 1958), who married Lucy Ferry (1960–2018), and India Jane Birley (born 1961). Other descendants include the fashion designer and muse Loulou de la Falaise (1948–2011), who was married to Desmond FitzGerald, 29th Knight of Glin (1937–2011), and later to Thadée Klossowski de Rola, a French writer who is the younger son of the painter Balthus (1908–2001). Loulou de la Falaise's niece is the fashion model Lucie de la Falaise (born 1973).

References

External links

 
Churchill by Oswald Birley - UK Parliament Living Heritage
 Charleston Manor
 Entry on Birley family genealogy
 Works by Oswald Birley (public domain in Canada)

1880 births
1952 deaths
19th-century English painters
20th-century English painters
Alumni of Trinity College, Cambridge
Oswald Birley
British Army personnel of World War I
British Home Guard officers
British people of English descent
English male painters
English portrait painters
Intelligence Corps officers
Knights Bachelor
New Zealand emigrants to the United Kingdom
New Zealand knights
People educated at Harrow School
Royal Fusiliers officers
Members of the Royal Institute of Oil Painters